South Plympton is a suburb of Adelaide in the City of Marion.

South Plympton is bound by the Glenelg tram line to the north, Marion Road to the west, and Wood Street to the south; and it has a slightly complicated eastern boundary which includes Towers Terrace and Winifred Avenue.

History
The suburb was originally divided into smaller suburbs including Forbes, Harcourt Gardens and Vermont, which were amalgamated into South Plympton in 1947.

South Plympton Post Office opened on 5 January 1948. South Plympton's postcode is 5038, and the post office is located in the Forbes Shopping centre on Marion Road.

References

See also
List of Adelaide suburbs

Suburbs of Adelaide